Effective Torque is often referred to as wheel torque or torque to the wheels is primarily associated with automotive tuning. Torque can be measured using a dynamometer. Common units used in automotive applications can include ft·lbf and N·m. For more on units see: Foot-pound force.

The formula for effective torque to the wheels is:

Tw = Te * Ntf * ηtf

Ntf = Nt * Nf

ηtf = ηt * ηf

... where Tw is wheel torque, Te is engine torque, N is the gear ratio, η is the efficiency, and the subscripts t and f are for the gearbox and differential, respectively. Effective torque will often be 5-15% lower than the shaft or crank ratings of an engine due to a loss through the drivetrain.

For a general article please see: Machine torque.

References 

Engine technology